Lukáš Lacko was the defending champion but lost in the second round to Prajnesh Gunneswaran.

Marc-Andrea Hüsler won the title after defeating Botic van de Zandschulp 6–7(3–7), 7–6(7–2), 7–5 in the final.

Seeds

Draw

Finals

Top half

Bottom half

References

External links
Main draw
Qualifying draw

Wolffkran Open - Singles
2020 Singles